A waverider is a type of hypersonic aircraft that takes advantage of compression lift from its own shock wave.

Waverider may also refer to:

 Boeing X-51 Waverider, a hypersonic research aircraft
 Waverider (comics), a DC Comics superhero
 Wave Rider a series of ocean-going robots by Liquid Robotics